Zeppelin is a 1971 British World War I action-drama directed by Étienne Périer in Panavision and Technicolor. The film stars Michael York, Elke Sommer and Anton Diffring. Zeppelin depicts a fictitious attempt to raid Britain in a German Zeppelin to steal Magna Carta from its hiding place in one of Scotland's castles, or destroy it.

Plot
in 1915, during the First World War, Geoffrey Richter-Douglas (Michael York), a Scotsman of German descent, is a lieutenant in the British Army. He meets Stephanie (Alexandra Stewart), a German spy to whom he is attracted. She suggests that he escape to Germany, where the other members of his family and his friends are. He reports this contact to his commanding officer, Captain Whitney, who also wants Geoffrey to go to Germany, but on a secret mission to steal the plans of the LZ36, a new type of Zeppelin under development at Friedrichshafen.

Geoffrey pretends to be a deserter and travels to Germany, even getting shot in the arm by fellow British agents to sell the Germans the ruse. At Friedrichshafen, he meets his long-time friend Professor Altschul (Marius Goring), who lives with his beautiful and much younger wife, Erika (Elke Sommer), both of whom are scientists working on the new airship. Erika suspects that Geoffrey may be up to something, but keeps her suspicions to herself.

Geoffrey quickly learns that German Intelligence recruited him to travel to Germany for a specific military purpose. Following a meeting with Intelligence Colonel Hirsch (Anton Diffring), he is assigned to the LZ36 on its maiden test flight. As soon as it is declared airworthy, to maintain absolute secrecy without first returning to base, the airship is to take part in a military operation to steal or destroy British historical documents, including the copy of Magna Carta, from the National Archives at Balcoven Castle in Scotland. Geoffrey is to play a key role in the mission, using his knowledge of the Scottish countryside to guide the airship very close to the castle at night while the craft is gliding with its engines off. After leaving Germany, the zeppelin lands on a fjord in Norway to refuel and take on board a specially trained unit of soldiers armed with mustard gas.

Geoffrey misdirects the craft's wireless operator just long enough to send a message about the LZ36's location to British intelligence. The wireless operator returns and, upon hearing the reply and realizing what Geoffrey had done, engages him in a fight. Geoffrey manages to knock him out, and then throws him out an open window, telling the captain the wireless operator had fallen while scraping ice off the airship, as many craft personnel had been ordered to do. The explanation is believed, but Geoffrey does not have a chance to send any more information because Erika comes on the scene and removes an important radio component. The airship proceeds to Balcoven Castle.

Under cover of darkness, Geoffrey navigates the airship on its final approach to the castle. A local farmer hears the sound of the airship's engines just before they are cut, and raises the alarm with the local military base, but he is not immediately believed. Geoffrey has no option but to participate in the assault, but manages to slip away to try to raise the alarm. He persuades a sceptical radio operator to contact London, but after being wounded by German soldiers, the dying operator mistakes Geoffrey for a German spy and shoots him in the arm. The Germans launch an attack on the castle, but the historical documents they seek are in vaults inaccessible to them.

Meanwhile, alerted by the farmer's report and the radio operator's chaotic call, the British Admiralty scrambles several Royal Naval Air Service squadrons and dispatches ground troops. The British troops engage the Germans in a firefight, who withdraw empty-handed rather than risk losing the Zeppelin. The airship manages to slip away in the dark with a much depleted complement, but shortly after first light is caught by pursuing British aircraft. Several aircraft are shot down in the ensuing dogfight, but the Zeppelin is badly damaged. Despite desperately lightening the airship in an effort to stay in the air, the survivors are forced to crash-land near the coast of the neutral Netherlands. Geoffrey, Erika and the few remaining crew members make their way ashore just as the Zeppelin explodes.

Cast

Production 

Written by producer Owen Crump, the story of Zeppelin is set in mid-1915, during the First World War. The mission depicted is fictitious. Principal photography for the production began in late 1970.

J. Ronald Getty was an executive producer through his GMF Picture Corp. The movie was to be the first of a three-picture deal between GMF and Warner Bros. Filming took place at Malta. Peter Carsten was injured shooting bayonet scenes in the film.

The airships seen in the film include a  models based on the plans of the R33 class of British rigid airship, which was itself based on the German LZ 76, captured intact in September 1916. A replica of the control car was constructed for closeups and interiors, copied from the intact control car of the R33 held at the Royal Air Force Museum London; other interiors were built from plans held by the museum.

Exterior shots using the model were filmed over a large water tank in Malta; scenes showing the sheds in which the Zeppelin was housed were filmed at the historic R100/R101 airship sheds at Cardington, Bedfordshire, in England. Photographs taken from the air to depict the fictional Glen Mattock and Balcoven Castle were shot over Carreg Cennan Castle in Wales.

The air combat scenes were filmed using Lynn Garrison's collection of World War I replica aircraft, originally assembled for 20th Century Fox's The Blue Max (1966). During the aerial filming, one of the S.E.5a replicas flown by Irish Air Corps pilot Jim Liddy, collided with the Alouette helicopter used as a camera platform. Five people were killed, including aerial photographer Skeets Kelly and Burch Williams, brother of Hollywood producer/director Elmo Williams.

Reception
Zeppelin was well received by the public, who viewed the Zeppelin airship as the real "star", but critical reaction was not positive. The review in Variety noted, "Zeppelin settles for being just another wartime melodrama, with some good aerial sequences and a powerful, brisk raid sequence in the finale." In his review, A. H. Weiler of The New York Times wrote, "... the storied, giant, silver, cigar-shaped dirigible is carrying a flimsy, lighter-than-air spy tale that wouldn't burden a carrier pigeon."

See also
 List of British films of 1971

References

Notes

Citations

Bibliography

 Orriss, Bruce W. When Hollywood Ruled the Skies: The Aviation Film Classics of World War I. Los Angeles: Aero Associates, 2013. .

External links
 
 
 

1971 films
1970s action drama films
1970s adventure films
British spy films
1970s English-language films
World War I aviation films
British aviation films
War adventure films
World War I films based on actual events
World War I spy films
Films set in 1915
Films shot at Pinewood Studios
Films directed by Étienne Périer
Films scored by Roy Budd
1971 drama films
Airships in fiction
Films shot in Malta
Films shot in Wales
Films shot in Bedfordshire
Films about the British Armed Forces
Films set in Baden-Württemberg
Films set in castles
Films set in Scotland
Films set in Norway
1970s British films